The Cretan Anthem (Kritikos Ymnos) was the national anthem of the Cretan State. It was adopted in 1898 and it was sung to the tune of the Greek national anthem, originally composed by Nikolaos Mantzaros and adopted by Dionysios Davrangas, with new words by the poet Ioannis Polemis, celebrating Crete's bloody struggles for freedom from the Ottoman Empire.

The anthem never gained much popularity, since the Cretans viewed the Cretan State as a temporary measure; the Greek national anthem was the de facto unofficial anthem, and after Crete unilaterally declared its union with the Kingdom of Greece in 1908 (not formally recognized until 1913, after the Balkan Wars), the Greek national anthem was used officially as well.

Greek original 
Μεσ' το αίμα βουτημένη,

με πληγαίς νωπαίς ακόμα,

απ΄ της Κρήτης τ' άγιο χώμα,

επεταχθ' η Λευθεριά•

κι' αγκαλιάζοντας τη Δόξα

τη δαφνοστεφανωμένη

παίρνει δρόμους κι ανασταίνει

πολιτείαις και χωριά.

Χαιρετούν τον ερχομό της

βροντερόφωνα ντουφέκια,

κι' αστραπαίς κι' αστροπελέκια

χύνουν λάμψι περισσή•

και φωνή παλληκαρίσια

απ' την Ίδη κατεβαίνει

Χαίρε, Κρήτη ανδρειωμένη,

Χαιρ' ελεύθερο νησί.

Transliteration

Mes' to aíma voutiméni, me pligaís nopaís akóma, 

ap΄ tis Krítis t' ágio chóma, 

epetachth' i Leftheriá• 

ki' ankaliázontas ti 

Dóxa ti dafnostefanoméni 

paírnei drómous ki anastaínei politeíais kai choriá.
 
Chairetoún ton erchomó tis vronterófona ntoufékia,
 
ki' astrapaís ki' astropelékia chýnoun lámpsi perissí• 

kai foní pallikarísia ap' tin Ídi katevaínei 

Chaíre, Kríti andreioméni, Chair' eléfthero nisí.

External sources

Cretan State
Historical national anthems
European anthems
National anthem compositions in F major